Bere Mill Meadows is a  biological Site of Special Scientific Interest east of Whitchurch in Hampshire.

These damp meadows in the flood plain of the River Test have a network of ditches with plants such as floating sweet-grass and lesser water-parsnip. The meadows have a rich variety of wet grassland herbs, including bogbean, ragged-robin,  water avens, marsh valerian and southern marsh orchid.

References

 
Sites of Special Scientific Interest in Hampshire